Casperius Aelianus who served as Praetorian Prefect under the emperors Domitian and Nerva, was a Praetorian Prefect loyal to the Roman Emperor Domitian, the last of the Flavian dynasty. After Domitian's murder and the ascension of the Emperor Nerva, Aelianus laid siege to the Imperial Capital in order to force the capture of the men responsible for Domitian's death, who had not been punished by Nerva.  Aelianus succeeded in his demands, greatly weakening the authority of the Emperor so much that Nerva realized that his position was no longer tenable without the support of an heir who had the approval of the Roman army. Within two or three months Nerva announced the adoption of the highly respected general Trajan as his successor.

Shortly thereafter, in January 98 AD, Nerva died of natural causes. Trajan, who was in Cologne, accepted the empire, and stayed north of the Alps for some time. Cassius Dio writes: "He sent for Aelianus and the praetorians who had mutinied against Nerva, pretending that he was going to employ them for some purpose, and then put them out of the way." [Roman History 68.5.4]

It is not known what "put them out of the way" means. It may be that the men were executed, but it is also possible that they were requested to retire.

References

External links 
Livius.org: Casperius Aelianus

1st-century Romans
Flavian dynasty
Praetorian prefects